Ghent Ridge is a ridge that parallels the south flank of Commonwealth Glacier,  north of Mount Falconer, in the lower Taylor Valley of Victoria Land, Antarctica. The Victoria University of Wellington Antarctic Expedition (VUWAE), 1965–66, called this feature "Smith Ridge," presumably after I. Smith, a member of the VUWAE field party, but that toponym is already in use for other features. It was therefore recommended that this ridge be named after Edward D. Ghent, leader of the 1965–66 expedition, and later with the Department of Geology, University of Calgary, Alberta, Canada.

References

Ridges of Victoria Land
McMurdo Dry Valleys